Samuel Ritchie Neel (1875-1947) was an American male tennis player who was active in the late 19th century.

In 1896, Neel won the men's doubles title at the U.S. National Championships with his brother Carr Neel, defeating defending champions Robert Wrenn and Malcolm Chace. The pair also reached the final in 1894. In singles, Neel reached the semifinals of the Western States Championships in 1899.

Grand Slam finals

Doubles (1 titles, 1 runner-up)

References

19th-century American people
19th-century male tennis players
United States National champions (tennis)
Grand Slam (tennis) champions in men's doubles
1875 births
1947 deaths
American male tennis players
Tennis people from Montana